An Earful O' Wax is a compilation album, released by Guided By Voices in 1992.

Other releases of this album may have a different image.

Track listing 
 Navigating Flood Regions
 Captain's Dead
 The Hard Way
 Crux
 Hey Hey, Spaceman
 An Earful O'Wax
 Lips Of Steel
 How Loft I Am
 Sometimes I Cry
 A Visit To The Creep Doctor
 The Future Is In Eggs
 The Great Blake Street Canoe Race
 Pendulum
 Long Distance Man
 Old Battery
 The Old Place
 Liar's Tale

References 

1992 compilation albums
Guided by Voices compilation albums